The E.H. Harriman Award was an annual award presented to American railroad companies in recognition for outstanding safety achievements.

History
The award was founded in 1913 by Mary Averell Harriman, wife of the late Edward H. Harriman.  After her death, the award was presented by her sons E. Roland Harriman and W. Averell Harriman.  Today the award is sponsored by the E.H. Harriman Memorial Awards Institute.
On January 5, 2012, UP announced to its employees that for the first time in ninety-eight years the Harriman award would be retired after the 2012 award ceremony. The Association of American Railroads (AAR) made the decision to end the award presentation.

Criticism
While the awards were intended to encourage safe operating practices and safety enhancements, the awards have also occasionally been the source of some labor disputes.  Part of the award criteria has been a count of the number of reported workplace injuries as tracked by the Federal Railroad Administration (FRA); this has led to disciplinary action and even dismissal for employees at some railroads. Union Pacific Railroad (UP), in particular, was shown to have suppressed reporting of some accidents in the early 1970s, leading to their disqualification and withdrawal from consideration for the award over several years. UP launched an intensive safety program and again earned a Harriman gold medal in 1984. 

Several rail labor unions objected to the criteria, going so far as to picket the award ceremonies.  Brotherhood of Maintenance of Way Employes (BMWE) General Chairman Paul Beard created the "Harassment Award" as a satire of the Harriman Awards to raise awareness of management practices that bred intimidation and disciplinary actions against reporting accidents.  In 1999 the FRA invited discussions with representatives of rail labor unions to discuss the problem.

Recipients
The selection process included a rule that the same railroad company could not be selected for a gold medal in two consecutive years. This practice ended in the 1970s when Santa Fe Railroad was selected as the gold medal recipient for several consecutive years.

Railroad companies are grouped into one of four categories:
 Group A railroads are line-haul railroads with greater than 15 million employee hours per year.
 Group B railroads are line-haul railroads with between 4 and 15 million employee hours per year.
 Group C railroads are line-haul railroads with less than 4 million employee hours per year.
 Group S&T railroads are switching and terminal railroads

Historically, the award recipients were notified in May of the year following the statistics calculation with the presentation ceremony in September or October.  Later the award announcements and presentations were made in May of the year after the award designation; for example, the 2004 awards were presented in May 2005.  Past recipients of the E.H. Harriman Award were:

References
Citations

Bibliography
Association of American Railroads (May 19, 2005), Railroads Set Another Employee Safety Record in 2004. E. H. Harriman Memorial Awards Honors Outstanding Performance in Rail Safety.  Retrieved January 11, 2006.
Belt Railway of Chicago (2005), The Belt Railway of Chicago: Safety.  Retrieved January 11, 2006.
BNSF Railway (May 19, 2005), BNSF Wins E.H. Harriman Memorial Silver Safety Award. Retrieved January 11, 2006.
Indiana Harbor Belt Railroad (May 12, 2000), IHB Railroad wins award for improved safety performance.  Retrieved January 11, 2006.
Kansas City Southern (May 8, 2001), KCS and Gateway Western Receive Gold E.H. Harriman Memorial Safety Awards.  Retrieved January 11, 2006.
Metra (May 23, 2003), Metra earns two Harriman Awards. Retrieved January 11, 2006.
Norfolk Southern Railway, Norfolk Southern Earns 16th Consecutive Harriman Rail Safety Award.  Retrieved January 11, 2006.
Terminal Railroad Association Harriman Gold Medal Award Winner.  Retrieved January 11, 2006.

Rail transportation in the United States
Rail transport industry awards
Awards established in 1913
1913 establishments in the United States
Awards disestablished in 2012
Occupational safety and health awards